Sea Glass is the twenty-seventh studio album by King Creosote, released in 2004.

Track listing
For The Last Time - Hello       
Nooks       
A Friday Night In New York       
Little Heart       
This Flaw That Flaw       
At The WAL       
My Favourite Girl In All The World       
Running On Fumes       
So Forlorn       
Your Guess Who's In At The Core?       
Comfort In Rum   
Waterfall

2004 albums
King Creosote albums